In enzymology, a cis-zeatin O-beta-D-glucosyltransferase is an enzyme that catalyzes the chemical reaction

UDP-glucose + cis-zeatin  UDP + O-beta-D-glucosyl-cis-zeatin

Thus, the two substrates of this enzyme are UDP-glucose and cis-zeatin, whereas its two products are UDP and O-beta-D-glucosyl-cis-zeatin.

This enzyme belongs to the family of glycosyltransferases, specifically the hexosyltransferases.  The systematic name of this enzyme class is UDP-glucose:cis-zeatin O-beta-D-glucosyltransferase.

References

 

EC 2.4.1
Enzymes of unknown structure